The 1994 PBA All-Filipino Cup Finals was the best-of-7 championship series of the 1994 PBA All-Filipino Cup, and the conclusion of the conference playoffs. The San Miguel Beermen and Coney Island Ice Cream Stars played for the 57th championship contested by the league. A trip to Hiroshima, Japan, for the Asian Games in September is at stake for the winner to represent the Country in basketball competition.

San Miguel Beermen won their 11th league crown and earn the right by winning against defending champion Coney Island Ice Cream Stars in six games, avenging their last season's All-Filipino Cup finals loss to this same team as the Beermen became the first back-to-back champions in the 1990s era.

Qualification

Series scoring summary

Games summary

Game 1

Rookie Richie Ticzon buried back-to-back triples in a 16–2 run by the Ice Cream Stars that erased a 78–71 San Miguel lead early in the fourth period to an 87–80 Coney Island advantage, Alvin Patrimonio and Jerry Codinera played well without relief in the second half, together with rookie Rey Evangelista, delivered the points, mostly within the shaded lane, Allan Caidic fired 41 points, seven triples with two four-point plays, except for Ato Agustin, the Beermen didn't get ample support from the rest of Caidic's teammates.

Game 2

Allan Caidic scored 27 points and the Beermen, behind Yves Dignadice's 10 boards and Dong Polistico's clogging the lanes, held the upper hand in rebounds, 38–31, and predictably prevailed, a rotating double team was clamped on Alvin Patrimonio, while the rest of the Ice Cream Stars were hounded by the relentless defensive pressure applied by the Beermen.

Game 3

Coney Island was leading, 65–61 in the fourth period when the Beermen unleashed a 12–0 bomb as the Stars went scoreless in a long while, Allan Caidic and Ato Agustin hit with unerring accuracy, Caidic's trey gave San Miguel a 10-point advantage at 80–70.

Game 4

Trailing 69–72 entering the fourth quarter, the Beermen held Coney Island to only 12 points in the final period, with Allan Caidic and Ato Agustin again doing the scoring, both teams played rugged defense with many elbows, trippings, Alvin Patrimonio's face was badly hurt when he was hit by Ramon Fernandez' shoulder.

Game 5

Alvin Patrimonio poured all of his 22 points in the second half while Vince Hizon chipped in three triples that enable the Ice Cream Stars to pull away and extend the series.

Game 6

San Miguel stormed quickly and established their biggest lead of 17 points, 39–22 in the second quarter. The Ice Cream Stars, from a 32–45 halftime deficit, threatened to within five points late in the third period at 50–55, but Ramon Fernandez anchored a 9–2 counterattack to give the Beermen a 64–52 lead. Allan Caidic's trey put San Miguel up by 11 at 69–58 in the fourth quarter, Yves Dignadice scored four crucial points at close range in the last four minutes for a 76–68 Beermen advantage. Alvin Patrimonio went hard for the basket to cut the deficit again to five points at 72–77. On San Miguel's possession, Alvin Teng was a recipient of a perfect pass and scored underneath for a safe 79–72 lead with less than two minutes left.

Rosters

Broadcast notes

References

External links
PBA official website

1994 PBA season
1994
San Miguel Beermen games
Magnolia Hotshots games
PBA All-Filipino Cup Finals